Gurulmundi is a locality in the Western Downs Region, Queensland, Australia.

History 
The location takes its name from an Aboriginal word meaning low hills.

Gurulmindi Provisional School opened on 27 February 1928. It became Gurulmindi State School on 1 January 1944. It closed on 10 May 1965.

References 

Western Downs Region